Vladimir Yevgenyevich Turchinsky (28 September 1963 – 16 December 2009) was a Russian wrestler, strongman, television and radio presenter, actor, author, singer and businessman. After completing military service he took various odd jobs, as a photographer, bodyguard, security officer, circus performer, and translator from English and French. He later became a notable media personality capitalizing on his massive physique and a strongman image.

Turchinsky was a Master of Sports in sambo and judo. He internationally played American football, and competed in the International Gladiators 1 series under the stage name Dynamite. He held the following Guinness World Records: shifting Antonov An-124 Ruslan, and moving a 20-ton truck over 100 meters.

Films
Spetsnaz (2002) – Colonel Vladimir Ozornyh
Yeralash (2006) – "Terminator"
Fitil (2006)
Happy Together (2006) – cameoThe Best Movie (2008) – arms dealerSvaty (2008) – cameoDaddy's Daughters'' (2009) – bodybuilding coach

Books

References

External links

1963 births
2009 deaths
Male actors from Moscow
Russian male film actors
Russian television presenters
Russian bodybuilders
Russian male television actors
Russian male voice actors
20th-century Russian businesspeople
Russian strength athletes